Aw (sometimes spelled Au) is an honorific title in the Harari and Somali languages. It is used widely and most commonly in the Somali territories. During his research in the ancient town of Amud, the historian G.W.B. Huntingford noticed that whenever an old site had the prefix Aw in its name (such as the ruins of Awbare and Awbube), it denoted the final resting place of a local saint. It commonly designates a father, respected elder or saint in Harari and Somali languages. Most notably applied to the founder of Harar Aw Abadir. The term has been adopted by various Somali clans from Harari language. According to the Somali Geledi clan, the appellation Aw is used amongst them however more devoutly between those of Habasha descent and patricians. Sorcerers among the Arsi Oromo are known as Awan Shan which is derived from the title Aw.

People with the title include:

Aw Barkhadle, saint
Aw Abdal, saint
Aw Ali Hamdogn, saint and scholar 
Aw Umar Ziad, saint
Aw Seid, saint

Further reading
 Emile Foucher, Names of Mussulmans venerated in Harrar and its Surroundings A List. Harrassowitz Verlag, 1988

References

Sources
 

Noble titles